The Michigan Wolverines softball team represents the University of Michigan in National Collegiate Athletics Association (NCAA) Division I competition.  College softball became a varsity sport at the University of Michigan in 1978.  Bonnie Tholl has been the head coach since 2023, following the retirement of longtime head coach Carol Hutchins.  In 2005, Hutchins' team became the first Division I softball team since 1976 from east of the Mississippi River to win the Women's College World Series.

History

Soluk years
Gloria Soluk was the first head coach of the Michigan Wolverines softball team.  When she was hired by Michigan in 1977, it was as Michigan's women's basketball coach, and there was no softball team.  She later recalled, "I was asked to serve as the head coach for the first few seasons in order to get things off the ground."  In her three seasons as head coach from 1978 to 1980, the Wolverines compiled a record of 50 wins and 25 losses for a .667 winning percentage.

De Carolis years
Bob De Carolis was the Wolverines second head coach, holding that position from 1980 to 1984.  In his four seasons as head coach, the Wolverines compiled a record of 114 wins and 81 losses for a .585 winning percentage.  In 1982, De Carolis led Michigan to a first-place finish in the AIAW Regional Championships and a third-place finish in the AIAW Women's College World Series.  De Carolis remained on Michigan's athletic department staff until 1998 when he accepted a post with Oregon State University.  He has been Oregon State's athletic director since 2002.

Hutchins era
Carol Hutchins became the head coach of the Michigan Wolverines softball team in 1985.  When she took over as head coach, Hutchins reportedly "had a tiny salary, an only slightly larger budget, and had to take care of her own field, throwing down lime and riding the lawn tractor."  Since Hutchins became Michigan's coach, the team has never had a losing season.  Hutchins' teams have also won 19 Big Ten Conference regular-season titles and 18 NCAA regional championships.  She has been named Big Ten Coach of the Year on eighteen occasions and National Fastpitch Coaches Association (NFCA) National Coach of the Year twice.

She led the Michigan softball team to its first NCAA Women's College World Series championship in 2005. The decisive game was won in dramatic fashion, with a Samantha Findlay home run in the top of the 10th inning, producing a 4–1 final.  The 2005 Michigan Wolverines softball team was the first team from East of the Mississippi River to win the Women's College World Series. (Hutchins played shortstop for Michigan State when they won the AIAW national championship in 1976.) The Ann Arbor News described the team's accomplishment this way:"What happened during the past five months might be the most unlikely accomplishment in the history of a storied athletics program, analogous to setting out to win an NCAA hockey title at the University of New Mexico.  Then doing it.  Now, before you dismiss that as hyperbole, consider a few factors.  Like the fact that, because of cold weather, the Wolverines played their first 33 games on the road, roughly half the season. Try doing that in football or basketball.  Then there's recruiting.  Softball is still a sport dominated by West Coast talent. ... There's a reason no team East of the Mississippi had won an NCAA softball title until now."

After Michigan defeated No. 1 ranked Arizona in March 2005, Hutchins told a reporter, "Yes, there is softball east of the Rockies."  The performance of the 2005 team also set Michigan records in several categories:
 The team's 65 victories was the most in school history;
 The team recorded 32 consecutive victories between February 13, 2005, and March 30, 2005; 
 The team's 103 home runs tied for the second most in NCAA history.

After winning the World Series, Hutchins and her team visited the White House in July 2005, where they met with President George W. Bush, something Hutchins called "a once-in-a-lifetime experience."

In 2006, Hutchins was inducted into the NFCA Hall of Fame.

In March 2000, Hutchins recorded her 638th win, giving her more career wins than any other coach in University of Michigan history in any sport, male or female.   In 2007, she became the seventh coach in NCAA softball history, and the first in any sport at the University of Michigan, to reach 1,000 career wins.  After winning her 1,000th game, Hutchins told a reporter that her greatest pride did not come from the 1,000 wins, but from her ability to influence how her players look at life, "to get them to work together and to meet standards, to show them they can lead as women."  When she was inducted into the NFCA Hall of Fame, her players presented her with a scrapbook with a note from one saying, "I came here a girl with potential and left here a woman with no limits."  Hutchins noted that those 15 words matter more than the 1,000 wins.

In 2009, the Wolverines advanced to the Women's College World Series in Oklahoma City.  They won the first game against Alabama by a score of 6–1.  In their second game, they lost a close game to Florida by a score of 1–0.  They were eliminated in a 7–5 loss to Georgia on May 30, 2009.

In 2015, behind the hitting of Sierra Romero and the pitching of Megan Betsa and Haylie Wagner, Michigan won its ninth Big Ten tournament and its eighth consecutive Big Ten regular season championship, and were the 2015 Women's College World Series runner-up.

On October 4, 2017, Hutchins signed a five-year contract extension with the Wolverines.

On August 24, 2022, Hutchins announced her retirement after 38 years as head coach at Michigan. At the time of her retirement, she was the winningest coach in NCAA Division I history, compiling a record of 1,684–540–5 at Michigan.

Tholl era
Following the retirement of long-time head coach Hutchins, Bonnie Tholl was named the head coach on August 24, 2022.

Coaching history

Championships

NCAA Women's College World Series National Championships

Conference Championships

Conference Tournament Championships

Coaching staff

Year-by-year results

This is a partial list of the last five seasons completed by the Wolverines.

Notable players

National Awards
NFCA National Player of the Year
Sierra Romero (2016)

USA Softball Collegiate Player of the Year
Sierra Romero (2016)

espnW National Player of the Year
Sierra Romero (2016)

Honda Sports Award
Sierra Romero (2016)

Conference Awards
Big Ten Player of the Year
Vicki Morrow, 1987
Michelle Bolster, 1988
Jenny Allard, 1989
Patti Benedict, 1992, 1993
Sara Griffin, 1995, 1996
Traci Conrad, 1998, 1999
Melissa Taylor, 2001
Marissa Young, 2003
Jessica Merchant, 2004
Nikki Nemitz, 2010
Maggie Viefhaus, 2010
Amanda Chidester, 2011, 2012
Sierra Romero, 2013, 2014, 2016
Lexie Blair, 2021

Big Ten Pitcher of the Year
Kelly Kovach, 1992, 1995
Kelly Forbis, 1993
Kelly Holmes, 1997
Sara Griffin, 1998
Marie Barda, 1999
Marissa Young, 2002
Nicole Motycka, 2004
Jennie Ritter, 2005
Nikki Nemitz, 2009
Jordan Taylor, 2010
Haylie Wagner, 2012
Megan Betsa, 2015, 2016
Meghan Beaubien, 2018
Alex Storako, 2021

Big Ten Freshman of the Year
Patti Benedict, 1990
Kelly Kovach, 1992
Tracy Carr, 1993
Sara Griffin, 1995
Traci Conrad, 1996
Melissa Gentile, 1997
Kelsey Kollen, 1999
Nicole Motycka, 2002
Samantha Findlay, 2005
Jordan Taylor, 2008
Haylie Wagner, 2012
Sierra Romero, 2013
Meghan Beaubien, 2018

Big Ten Coach of the Year
Carol Hutchins, 1985
Carol Hutchins, 1992
Carol Hutchins, 1993
Carol Hutchins, 1996
Carol Hutchins, 1998
Carol Hutchins, 1999
Carol Hutchins, 2001
Carol Hutchins, 2004
Carol Hutchins, 2005
Carol Hutchins, 2008
Carol Hutchins, 2009
Carol Hutchins, 2011
Carol Hutchins, 2012
Carol Hutchins, 2013
Carol Hutchins, 2015
Carol Hutchins, 2016
Carol Hutchins, 2018
Carol Hutchins, 2021

All-Americans

Michigan has had 41 players selected as NFCA All-Americans, combining for 69 total honors.
 
2021: Alex Storako, at-large pitcher (2nd team)
2018: Meghan Beaubien, at-large pitcher (1st team)
2018: Faith Canfield, at-large 2nd base (3rd team)
2017: Megan Betsa, pitcher (2nd team)
2017: Kelly Christner, outfielder (2nd team)
2017: Faith Canfield, 2nd base (3rd team)
2016: Sierra Lawrence, outfielder (1st team)
2016: Tera Blanco, 1st base (1st team)
2016: Sierra Romero, 2nd base (1st team)
2016: Megan Betsa, pitcher (2nd team)
2015: Kelly Christner, outfielder (1st team)
2015: Sierra Romero, at-large 2nd base (1st team)
2014: Sierra Romero, shortstop (1st team)
2014: Haylie Wagner, at-large pitcher (2nd team)
2013: Sierra Romero, shortstop (2nd team)
2013: Ashley Lane, 2nd base (3rd team)
2011: Amanda Chidester, 3rd base (1st team)
2011: Jordan Taylor, at-large pitcher (2nd team)
2011: Ashley Lane, 2nd base (2nd team)
2011: Bree Evans, outfielder (3rd team)
2009: Nikki Nemitz, at-large pitcher (1st team)
2009: Amanda Chidester, utility non-pitcher (2nd team)
2008: Samantha Findlay, second base (1st team)
2008: Jordan Taylor, pitcher (2nd team)
2008: Alessandra Giampaolo, outfielder (2nd team)
2008: Nikki Nemitz, pitcher (3rd team)
2006: Jennie Ritter, pitcher (1st team)
2006: Becky Marx, catcher (3rd team)
2005: Jennie Ritter, pitcher (1st team)
2005: Jessica Merchant, shortstop (2nd team)
2005: Tiffany Haas, 2nd base (1st team)
2005: Nicole Motycka, designated player (3rd team)
2004: Jessica Merchant, shortstop (2nd team)
2004: Nicole Motycka, pitcher (2nd team)
2004: Tiffany Haas, 2nd base (3rd team)
2003: Marissa Young, utility (2nd team)
2002: Stephanie Volpe, 3rd base (1st team)
2002: Marissa Young, pitcher (3rd team)
2001: Kelsey Kollen, 2nd base (1st team)
2001: Melissa Taylor, outfield (2nd team)
2000: Marissa Young, utility (3rd team)
2000: Stephanie Volpe, designated player (3rd team)
1999: Catherine Davie, outfield (2nd team)
1999: Kelsey Kollen, 2nd base (2nd team)
1999: Traci Conrad, 1st base (3rd team)
1998: Traci Conrad, 1st base (1st team)
1998: Sara Griffin, utility (1st team)
1998: Melissa Gentile, catcher (2nd team)
1998: Kellyn Tate, outfield (2nd team)
1997: Traci Conrad, at-large (1st team)
1997: Kelly Holmes, at-large (2nd team)
1996: Sara Griffin, utility (1st team)
1996: Kellyn Tate, outfield (3rd team)
1995: Kelly Kovach, pitcher (1st team)
1995: Sara Griffin, utility (1st team)
1993: Patti Benedict, outfield (1st team)
1992: Patti Benedict, outfield (3rd team)
1989: Jenny Allard, utility (1st team)
1987: Alicia Seegert, catcher (2nd team)
1987: Vicki Morrow, designated player/utility (2nd team)
1986: Alicia Seegert, catcher (1st team)

Athletic Hall of Honor
 Penny Neer - (Class of 2002)
 Vicki Morrow - (Class of 2004)
 Alicia Seegert - (Class of 2005)
 Jenny Allard - (Class of 2008)
 Sara Griffin - (Class of 2011)
 Traci Conrad - (Class of 2015)
 Jennie Ritter - (Class of 2018)
 Samantha Findlay - (Class of 2022)

See also
 2005 Women's College World Series
 1982 Women's College World Series
 List of NCAA Division I softball programs

References

External links

Official website